Cameraria diabloensis is a moth of the family Gracillariidae. It is known from the California, United States.

The length of the forewings is 3.3-4.3 mm.

The larvae feed on Quercus chrysolepis var. nana. They mine the leaves of their host plant. The mine is ovoid to quadrate. The epidermis is opaque yellow tan. All mines cross the midrib and consume 60%-95% of the leaf surface. The mines are solitary and normally have two parallel folds, occasionally one or three.

Etymology
The specific name is derived from the type-locality (Mount Diablo) and the Latin suffix -ensis (denoting place, locality).

References

Cameraria (moth)

Moths of North America
Lepidoptera of the United States
Moths described in 1981
Leaf miners
Taxa named by Donald R. Davis (entomologist)
Taxa named by Paul A. Opler